Thacher may refer to:

People
Ebby Thacher (1896–1966), early member of the sobriety movement that later became Alcoholics Anonymous
George Thacher (1817–1878), an American academic
James Thacher (1754–1844), an American physician
Jeff Thacher (born 1967), an American musician
James Kingsley Thacher (1847–1891), his son, an American professor of medicine
John Boyd Thacher (1847–1909), mayor of Albany, New York, like his father George Thacher
John Boyd Thacher II, his nephew, mayor of Albany, New York
Nicholas G. Thacher (1915–2002), an American diplomat
Peter Thacher (1752–1802), a n American congregationalist minister
Russell Thacher (c. 1919 – 1990), an American author and film producer 
Ryan Thacher (born 1989), an American tennis player
Samuel Cooper Thacher (1785–1818), an American clergyman and librarian
Solon O. Thacher (1830-1895), American politician, judge, and lawyer
Thomas Thacher (minister) (1620–1678), English clergyman and settler in New England
Thomas Anthony Thacher (1815–1886), a descendant, an American classicist and college administrator
Sherman Day Thacher, his son, founder of the Thacher School
Thomas Thacher (1850–1919), his son, an American lawyer
Thomas D. Thacher, his son and Solicitor General of the United States
Elizabeth Thacher Kent (1868–1952), his daughter, an environmentalist and women's rights activist
Thomas Chandler Thacher (1858–1945), American politician
William Thacher (1866–1953), an American tennis player

Places
Thacher, Ohio, U.S.
Thatcher, Nebraska, U.S., also known as Thacher
Thachers Hill, New Jersey, U.S.
Thacher Island, off Cape Ann, Massachusetts, U.S.
Thacher River, in Massachusetts, U.S.

Other uses
The Thacher School, Ojai, California, U.S.

See also

Thacker (disambiguation)
Thatcher (disambiguation)
Simpson Thacher & Bartlett
Thacher Proffitt & Wood

Occupational surnames